Benjamin Kurtz Focht (March 12, 1863 – March 27, 1937) was a Republican member of the U.S. House of Representatives from Pennsylvania.

Biography
Benjamin K. Focht was born in New Bloomfield, Pennsylvania.  He attended Bucknell University in Lewisburg, Pennsylvania, Pennsylvania State College at State College, Pennsylvania, and Susquehanna University in Selinsgrove, Pennsylvania.  He established the Lewisburg Saturday News in 1881, serving as editor and publisher until his death.  He was a delegate to the Republican State Convention in 1889.  He served as an officer of the Pennsylvania National Guard.  He was a member of the Pennsylvania House of Representatives from 1893 to 1897, and a member of the Pennsylvania State Senate from 1901 to 1905.  He was water supply commissioner of Pennsylvania from 1912 to 1914.

Focht was elected as a Republican to the Sixtieth, Sixty-first, and Sixty-second Congresses.  He was unsuccessful candidate for reelection in 1912.  He was again elected to the Sixty-fourth and to the three succeeding Congresses.  He served as Chairman of the United States House Committee on War Claims during the Sixty-sixth Congress, and the United States House Committee on the District of Columbia during the Sixty-seventh Congress. He was an unsuccessful candidate for renomination in 1922, 1924, 1926, 1928, and 1930, and also in 1932 for the unexpired term of Edward M. Beers.  After his time in Congress he resumed business activities in Lewisburg.  He served as deputy secretary of the Commonwealth in 1928 and 1929.  Focht was again elected to the Seventy-third, Seventy-fourth, and Seventy-fifth Congresses and served until his death in Washington, D.C.

See also
 List of United States Congress members who died in office (1900–49)

Sources

The Political Graveyard

Republican Party Pennsylvania state senators
Republican Party members of the Pennsylvania House of Representatives
American newspaper editors
Bucknell University alumni
Pennsylvania State University alumni
1863 births
1937 deaths
American newspaper publishers (people)
Susquehanna University alumni
Republican Party members of the United States House of Representatives from Pennsylvania
People from Perry County, Pennsylvania
Journalists from Pennsylvania